The Cauca tree frog (Hyloscirtus caucanus) is a species of frog in the family Hylidae. Endemic to Colombia, its natural habitats are subtropical or tropical moist montane forests and rivers. Scientists have seen it between 2400 and 2720 meters above sea level. The frog is threatened by habitat loss.

References

Hyloscirtus
Amphibians of Colombia
Amphibians of the Andes
Amphibians described in 1993
Taxonomy articles created by Polbot